The David O. Dodd Memorial is a monument on the grounds of the Old State House in Little Rock, Arkansas. Erected in 1923 by Confederate memorial groups, it commemorates David O. Dodd, an Arkansas civilian who was executed by the U.S. Army for spying.  The monument has a horizontal base of gray marble, with a central columnar component, in which a relief portrait of Dodd is carved into white marble. It was listed on the National Register of Historic Places in 1996.

See also
 Arkansas in the American Civil War
 National Register of Historic Places listings in Little Rock, Arkansas

References

1923 sculptures
Confederate States of America monuments and memorials in Arkansas
Monuments and memorials in Little Rock, Arkansas
Monuments and memorials on the National Register of Historic Places in Arkansas
National Register of Historic Places in Little Rock, Arkansas
Neoclassical architecture in Arkansas
1923 establishments in Arkansas